Zolochiv (Zlotshov) is a small city of district significance in Lviv Oblast of Ukraine, the administrative center of Zolochiv Raion. It hosts the administration of Zolochiv urban hromada, one of the hromadas of Ukraine. The city is located 60 kilometers east of Lviv along Highway H02 Lviv-Ternopil and the railway line Krasne-Ternopil.

History

Medieval settlement, Tatar invasion
The site was occupied from AD 1180 under the name Radeche until the end of the 13th century when a wooden fort was constructed. This was burned in the 14th century during the invasion of the Crimean Tatars.

Polish town (1442) 
In 1442, the city was founded as "Złoczów", by John of Sienna, a Polish nobleman of the Dębno family although the first written mention of Zolochiv was in 1423.

By 1523, it was already a city of Magdeburg rights.

Zolochiv was incorporated as a town on 15 September 1523 by the Polish king Sigismund I the Old. Located in the Ruthenian Voivodship of the Polish–Lithuanian Commonwealth, it belonged to several noble families.

Austrian period (1772–1918) 
From the first partition of Poland in 1772 until 1918, the town was part of the Austrian monarchy (Austria side after the compromise of 1867), head of the district with the same name, one of the 78 Bezirkshauptmannschaften in Austrian Galicia province, or "Crown land", in 1900.

Interbellum: Polish Złoczów 
From 15 March 1923 until the Invasion of Poland in 1939, when the town was occupied by the Soviet Union, Zolochiv, still named Złoczów, belonged to the Tarnopol Voivodship of the second Republic of Poland.

World War Two

First Soviet occupation
Zolochiv was occupied by the USSR from September 1939 to July 1941. At the Zolochiv prison they committed horrific atrocities against Ukrainian nationalists including priests.

Nazi occupation
After July 1941, Zolochiv was occupied by Germany and incorporated into the General Government in the District of Galicia.

On 27 June, the town and its surrounding vicinity was bombed by the Germans, causing panic. In the weeks prior the Germans had parachuted into the area.

On 1 July the Germans arrived in the town, rumours had been circulating of a massacre in the Old Polish Prison, a two-three storied building on Ternopil St. Many Ukrainian locals were able to identify their friends and loved ones amongst the victims. Several rows of corpses were lined up in a pit in the prison yard that was encrusted with blood and human flesh. People repeated that the NKVD had been running tractor engines during the massacre to quiet the noise of those being tortured.

Those clearing the yard had to work quickly as due to the summer heat the bodies were decomposing and there was a risk of disease spreading. Inside the prison cells, Greek-Catholic priests were found with crosses carved into their chests. In one cell a pool of coagulated blood lay with numerous corpses that had been severely tortured.

One of the local Jews, named Shmulko, who had worked in the flour mill before the war but had joined the NKVD and worked at the prison upon the Soviet invasion, was captured near Sasiv. The individual was forced to show people the corpses of their relatives and friends and was then stoned to death. Before he died he confessed to a second burial pit, that people had suspected but could not find.

The Germans forced local Jews to clear the prison and clean the bodies of those killed and place them outside of the prison for further identification. After that SS troops executed those Jewish people, no Ukrainians participated.

According to a German Einsatzgruppen report in Zolochiv "before the Russians fled . . . they arrested and killed in all about 700 Ukrainians. In retribution, the militia arrested several hundred Jews and shot them, on instructions from the Wehrmacht. The number of Jews killed was between 300 and 500." Then the killing spread beyond the fortress where the Ukrainians and Jews were shot. Within three to four days around 1400 Jews had been killed. Later the Germans shot another 300.

Once they established their occupation administration, the Germans began to rob and persecute the Jews, including forcing them to do slave labor. The confiscated their homes and valuables. In August 1942, the Germans with the assistance of the Ukrainian police, rounded up about 2000 Jews and sent them to Belzec where they were immediately murdered. In November, the German and Ukrainian police rounded up another 2500 and sent them to be murdered in Belzec. Other Jews were shot in Zolochiv. After that, the Germans established a ghetto to which Zolochiv Jews were confined along with Jews from other villages who had been sent there. The ghetto, containing about 4000 people, was severely overcrowded and lacked sanitary facilities. Consequently, a typhus epidemic broke out. In April 1943, about 3500 Jews were taken by German and Ukrainian police to be shot at a pit near the village of Yelhovitsa. One German official, Josef Meyer, tried to protect Jews, hiding several. After the war, Yad Vashem awarded him, his wife and two daughters the title Righteous Among the Nations.

There are numerous recorded cases of local Ukrainians sheltering Jews within the town of Zolochiv and the surrounding provinces. The number of Jewish survivors is unknown.

In the spring of 1942, guerrillas from the Organization of Ukrainian Nationalists (OUN) ambushed a Nazi transportation of livestock to the Reich, killing one or more Nazis. There were immediate reprisals on local Ukrainian nationalists. The Gestapo was vigilant and focused on eliminating the OUN within and around Zolochiv. Numerous Ukrainian nationalists were imprisoned in the Gestapo headquarters in Zolochiv and were later transported to Lącki prison in Lviv, these included Ivan Lahola, Bohdan Kachur and Stepan Petelycky.

On 1 December 1942 a ghetto was established, confined within the ghetto was a brewery where beer continued to be produced. Between 7,500–9,000 people were imprisoned there, as well as remnants of communities of the surrounding areas, including Olesko, Sasov, and Biali Kamen. The ghetto was liquidated on 2 April 1943, and 6,000 people were murdered in a mass execution perpetrated by an Einsatzgruppen at a pit near the village of Yelhovitsa.

Second Soviet occupation
From July 1944 to 16 August 1945, the town was occupied by the Red Army.

Soviet period
After the Yalta Conference (4–11 February 1945), drawn as a consequence of the findings of the interim Government of national unity signed on August 16, 1945, an agreement with the USSR, recognising the slightly modified Curzon line for the Eastern Polish border, on the basis of the agreement on the border between the Soviet Union and Polish Committee of National Liberation Government on 27 July 1944. In the Tarnopol voivodeship agreements, Zolochiv was included in the Ukrainian Soviet Socialist Republic in the USSR, where it remained until 1991.

Independent Ukraine
Since 1991, Zolochiv has been part of independent Ukraine.

Architectural landmarks
 Zolochiv Castle, built in the early 17th century by Jakub Sobieski (the king's father)
 Church of the Assumption, Zolochiv, 1730
 St. Nicholas Church, Zolochiv, 16th century
 Church of the Resurrection, Zolochiv, 17th century
 Church of the Ascension, Zolochiv, 19th century
 Arsenal, Zolochiv, 15th century

Destroyed
 Stone Synagogue, 1724 (destroyed during World War II)

Notable people

In chronological order:
 John III Sobieski (1629–1696), king of Poland and Grand Duke of Lithuania
 Katarzyna Sobieska (1634–1694), sister of John III Sobieski
 James Sobieski (1667–1737), Polish prince
 Rabbi Yechiel Michel (1726–1786)
 Ignacy Zaborowski (1754–1803), Polish mathematician and geodesist
 Zev Wolf of Zbaraz (died 1822), rabbi
 Franz von Hillenbrand (born c. 1801), German aristocrat, Imperial & Royal accountant
 Naphtali Herz Imber (1856–1909), Jewish poet, wrote lyrics of Hatikvah, the  national anthem of Israel
 Moyshe-Leyb Halpern (1886–1932), Yiddish writer
 Tadeusz Brzeziński (1896–1990), Polish diplomat, father of Zbigniew Brzezinski
 Abraham Shalit (1898–1979), Jewish historian, studied in Vienna, worked in Mandate Palestine/Israel
 Weegee - Arthur (Usher) Fellig (1899–1968), photographer, best known for his New York photos
 Ilya Schor (1904–1961), painter, jeweler, engraver, and artist of Judaica; lived in Europe and the US
 Jan Cieński (1905–1992), Roman Catholic bishop; worked in part clandestinely during Soviet era
 Marian Iwańciów (1906–1971), painter
 Carlos Feller (1923–2018), born Kalman Felberbaum; opera singer, emigrated in 1929 to Uruguay
 Roald Hoffmann (born 1937), Polish-American chemist, 1981 laureate of the Nobel Prize in Chemistry
 Andriy Husin (1972–2014), Ukrainian football player

Picture gallery

References

External links 

 Official city webpage  
 History of Zolochiv and Zolochiv Region (in Ukrainian) 

Cities in Lviv Oblast
Tarnopol Voivodeship
Shtetls
Cities of district significance in Ukraine
Holocaust locations in Ukraine
Populated places established in the 12th century